María Guadalupe Araujo Yong (born December 10, 1955), better known as Ana Gabriel, is a Mexican singer and songwriter. During her long career, she has performed different genres of music (primarily Latin pop, Latin ballad and Ranchera) and has received several accolades. As a result, she has been called  La Diva de América and La Luna de América.

As of 2013, Gabriel had released twenty studio albums, three live albums, and fifteen compilation albums. Three Gabriel albums reached number one on the Billboard Latin Pop Albums, and seven singles reached number one on the Billboard Hot Latin Songs chart, including "Ay Amor", "Es Demasiado Tarde", and "Quién Como Tú". Her work earned her numerous awards and accolades, including a Grammy Award nomination, four Latin Grammy Award nominations, thirteen Lo Nuestro Awards, as well as awards from the American Society of Composers, Authors and Publishers; in 2006, she received the Excellence Award at the Lo Nuestro Awards.

Early life
María Guadalupe Araujo Yong was born in Guamuchil, Sinaloa, Mexico on December 10, 1955. She did not receive formal training for singing and she credits her maternal grandfather Roberto Yong, an immigrant from China, for providing the only singing coaching she received.

She first sang on the stage at age six, singing "Regalo A Dios" by José Alfredo Jiménez. She moved to Tijuana, Baja California and studied accounting. At age 21, in 1977, she recorded her first song, titled "Compréndeme".

Career
In 1987, Ana Gabriel won third place at the OTI Festival, celebrated in Lisbon, Portugal, where she performed an orchestral version of the pop-power ballad song "Ay Amor", which later was released as a single in its album version; it climbed to the top position in Mexico, throughout Ibero-America and on the Billboard Hot Latin Tracks chart for 14 consecutive weeks. 
 
In 1988 Gabriel released her first album, Tierra de Nadie, followed by Pecado Original in 1989, which met with some chart success. Her 1990 album Quién Como Tú made her a force within the Mexican music industry. Eight months later, her live album En Vivo showcased her powerful stage act and scored several hits: "Hice Bien Quererte", "Propuesta", and "Solamente una Vez".

Throughout the 1990s Gabriel released an album almost every year. A versatile singer, she showcased her talent as an interpreter of many different musical styles, from lambada to mariachi and romantic ballads to pop music. She also honed her skills as a songwriter and a producer, releasing Mi México, a ranchera-influenced, mariachi-backed pop album, in 1991. This unique blend of styles was also reflected in the songs, all written by Gabriel. Her lyrics described strong, active women involved in their love lives, counter to their passive, traditional depiction in older songs. The album also included a tribute to Mexico's most popular singer-songwriter, Juan Gabriel (no relation).

Gabriel scored a number-one hit with the duet "Cosas del Amor" in 1991, which she sang with Vikki Carr, a Mexican-American pop singer. The single earned Gabriel a Lo Nuestro Award for Song of the Year in 1992. At the same awards ceremony, Gabriel was also named Female Artist of the Year in the Regional Mexican category and Pop Female Artist of the Year; Mi México was named Regional Mexican Album of the Year. In 1993, Gabriel was awarded Best Pop Female Performer at the Lo Nuestro Awards. The following year, she appeared as a guest artist on Plácido Domingo's Grammy-nominated album, De Mi Alma Latina.

In 1996 she released the pop-oriented Vivencias. She followed this with the traditional ranchera album Con un Mismo Corazón in 1997, an album she wrote and produced herself. Of particular interest is her title-track duet with Vicente Fernández, one of the most prolific and popular ranchera singers in Mexican history. Burr wrote of the duet, "The beauty here lies in the melding of two great voices—Gabriel's husky sensuality and Fernandez's powerful, understated expressions—set against a 25-piece symphony."

Gabriel released another live album in 1998, En la Plaza de Toros México, a 30-track boxed set. That same year she traveled to Miami to work with the renowned producer Emilio Estefan, Jr., on her 1999 album Soy Como Soy. The result was a pop-influenced ranchera album that went gold in the Latin music market and helped Gabriel win the Ritmo Latino Music Award for Female Pop Artist of the Year in 2000.

With the release of Eternamente in 2000, Gabriel returned to mariachi love ballads, using only guitar as accompaniment. That same year she also appeared with other Mexican music icons in an Independence Day television special called Viva Mexico, a celebration of Mexican music and history. In 2001 Gabriel released Huelo a Soledad, once again balancing the traditional sounds of Eternamente with sophisticated pop songs, a cappella numbers, and dance tracks.

In 2002, Gabriel's platinum-selling album Sagitario was released. In that same year, she won the Billboard Latin Music Estrella Award in recognition of her contribution to the Latin music industry, performed at a tribute concert for Vicente Fernandez sponsored by the Latin Music Awards, and participated in the ninth annual Las Cruces International Mariachi Concert and Festival in New Mexico. In December of that year, she was scheduled to perform at the eleventh annual Christmas Mariachi Festival in Phoenix, Arizona, but was denied a work visa and refused entry into the United States.

In December 2014, singer Ana Gabriel told reporters on TV Azteca's Ventaneando program that in 2015 she would release her new recording project after seven years without releasing an album with unreleased songs. She performed at the 2014 Viña del Mar Festival, receiving the award for most popular artist along with the gold and silver seagulls and torches. In 2015, she received the Legend Award at the Hispanic Heritage Awards. Two years later, she was inducted into the Latin American Songwriters Hall Of Fame.

In 2017, Gabriel appeared in the multi award-winning documentary film The American Epic Sessions directed by Bernard MacMahon. In the film, Gabriel recorded live on the restored first electrical sound recording system from the 1920s. She performed Lydia Mendoza's "Mal Hombre" accompanied by a large band featuring Omar Rodríguez-López and Van Dyke Parks. Stephen Dalton in The Hollywood Reporter described her performance as "fantastic".

Personal life

Gabriel identifies as asexual.

Albums

Studio albums 

Un estilo (1985)
Sagitario (1986)
Pecado Original (1987)
Tierra de nadie (1988)
Quién como tú (1989)
Mi México (1991)
Silueta (1992)
Luna (1993)
Ayer y hoy (1994)
Joyas de dos siglos (1995)
Vivencias (1996)
Con un mismo corazón (1997)
Soy como soy (1999)
Eternamente (2000)
Huelo a soledad (2001)
Dulce y salado (2003)
Tradicional (2004)
Dos amores, un amante (2006)
Arpegios de amor (2007)
Renacer... Homenaje a Lucha Villa (2009)
Por Amor a Ustedes (2020)

Live albums 
En Vivo (1990)
...En la Plaza de Toros México (1998)
Altos de Chavón: El Concierto (2013)
Un Mariachi en Altos de Chavón (2013)

Compilation albums 

The Best (1992)
Ayer y Hoy (1995)
The Best: The Latin Stars Series (1998)
20th Anniversary (1999)
3 CD Box (1999)
Una Voz Para tu Corazón - 30 Grandes Éxitos (2001)
Colección de Oro (2002)
Personalidad: 20 Éxitos (1992)
Historia de Una Reina (2005)
Canciones de Amor (2006)
La Reina Canta a México (2006)
Best of Ana Gabriel (2006)
Con Sentimiento (2006)
Los Gabriel… Simplemente Amigos (2007)
Los Gabriel: Cantan a México (2008)
Mis Favoritas (2010)
Mi Regalo, Mis Número 1... (2015)
Personalidad (2nd. Edition) (2016)
Music from The American Epic Sessions (2017)

Awards

Grammy Awards
The Grammy Awards are awarded annually by the National Academy of Recording Arts and Sciences in the United States. Ana Gabriel has received one nomination.

|-
|rowspan="1" scope="row"| 1991
|scope="row"| Quién como tú
|scope="row"| Best Latin Pop Performance
| 
|-

Latin Grammy Awards
The Latin Grammy Awards are awarded annually by the Latin Academy of Recording Arts & Sciences in the United States. Gabriel has received four nominations.

|-
|rowspan="1" scope="row"| 2005
|scope="row"| Tradicional
|scope="row"| Best Ranchero Album
| 
|-
|rowspan="2" scope="row"| 2006
|scope="row"| Dos amores un amante
|scope="row"| Best Ranchero Album
| 
|-
|scope="row"| "Sin Tu Amor"
|scope="row"| Best Regional/Mexican Song
| 
|-
|rowspan="1" scope="row"| 2008
|scope="row"| Arpegios de amor: Requiem por tres almas
|scope="row"| Best Female Pop Vocal Album
| 
|-

Lo Nuestro Awards
The Lo Nuestro Awards are awarded annually by television network Univision in the United States. Ana Gabriel has received thirteen awards from twenty-nine nominations.

|-
|rowspan="1" scope="row"| 1989
|scope="row"| Herself
|scope="row"| Best Pop Female Artist
| 
|-
|rowspan="3" scope="row"| 1990
|scope="row"| Tierra de Nadie
|scope="row"| Pop Album of the Year
| 
|-
|scope="row"| "Simplemente Amigos"
|scope="row"| Pop Song of the Year
| 
|-
|scope="row"| Herself
|scope="row"| Best Pop Female Artist
| 
|-
|rowspan="4" scope="row"| 1991
|scope="row"| Quién como tú
|scope="row"| Pop Album of the Year
| 
|-
|scope="row"| Herself
|scope="row"| Best Pop Female Artist
| 
|-
|scope="row"| "Es Demasiado Tarde"
|scope="row"| Pop Song of the Year
| 
|-
|scope="row"| "Quién Como Tú"
|scope="row"| Pop Song of the Year
| 
|-
|rowspan="5" scope="row"| 1992
|scope="row"| En Vivo
|scope="row"| Pop Album of the Year
| 
|-
|scope="row"| "Cosas del Amor" (with Vikki Carr)
|scope="row"| Pop Song of the Year
| 
|-
|scope="row"| Mi México
|scope="row"| Regional/Mexican Album of the Year
| 
|-
|scope="row"| Herself
|scope="row"| Best Pop Female Artist
| 
|-
|scope="row"| Herself
|scope="row"| Best Regional/Mexican Female Artist
| 
|-
|rowspan="3" scope="row"| 1993
|scope="row"| Herself
|scope="row"| Best Pop Female Artist
| 
|-
|scope="row"| "Evidencias"
|scope="row"| Pop Song of the Year
| 
|-
|scope="row"| Herself
|scope="row"| Best Regional/Mexican Female Artist
| 
|-
|rowspan="2" scope="row"| 1994
|scope="row"| Luna
|scope="row"| Pop Album of the Year
| 
|-
|scope="row"| Herself
|scope="row"| Best Pop Female Artist
| 
|-
|rowspan="4" scope="row"| 1995
|scope="row"| "Luna"
|scope="row"| Pop Song of the Year
| 
|-
|scope="row"| Herself
|scope="row"| Best Pop Female Artist
| 
|-
|scope="row"| Ayer y Hoy
|scope="row"| Regional/Mexican Album of the Year
| 
|-
|scope="row"| Herself
|scope="row"| Best Regional/Mexican Female Artist
| 
|-
|rowspan="2" scope="row"| 1996
|scope="row"| Herself
|scope="row"| Best Regional/Mexican Female Artist
| 
|-
|scope="row"| Joyas de dos siglos
|scope="row"| Regional/Mexican Album of the Year
| 
|-
|rowspan="2" scope="row"| 1998
|scope="row"| Herself
|scope="row"| Best Regional/Mexican Female Artist
| 
|-
|scope="row"| Con un mismo corazón
|scope="row"| Regional/Mexican Album of the Year
| 
|-
|rowspan="1" scope="row"| 1999
|scope="row"| Herself
|scope="row"| Best Regional/Mexican Female Artist
| 
|-
|rowspan="1" scope="row"| 2000
|scope="row"| Herself
|scope="row"| Best Regional/Mexican Female Artist
| 
|-
|rowspan="1" scope="row"| 2006
|scope="row"| Herself
|scope="row"| Excellence Award
| 
|-

References

Bibliography

 Lipsitz, George, Footsteps in the Dark: The Hidden Histories of Popular Music, U of Minnesota Press, 2007,

External links 
 

1955 births
Living people
Mexican people of Chinese descent
Mexican women singer-songwriters
Mexican singer-songwriters
Singers from Sinaloa
Sony Music Latin artists
Latin music songwriters
Mexico in the OTI Festival
People from Guamúchil
Women in Latin music
Asexual women